Joshua David Pask (born 1 November 1997) is an English professional footballer who plays as a defender for Cymru Premier side The New Saints.

Career

West Ham United 
Pask  started his career with his local club West Ham United, joining them at the age of eight. He progressed through the academy and went on to sign a two-year scholarship in the summer of 2014, after turning down an approach from Arsenal. In November 2014, despite still being a first year scholar he signed his first professional contract on his seventeenth birthday, agreeing a three-year deal.
In October 2015 he signed on a months's  loan for Dagenham & Redbridge, a loan which was extended in November for a further month.
On 8 August 2016, Pask signed for League One club Gillingham on a season-long loan deal. He made his Gillingham debut the following day in a 3–1 League Cup victory at Southend United.

His contract with West Ham finished at the end of the 2018–19 season.

Coventry City 
Having been released, Pask signed a three-year contract with Coventry City. He did not make his debut for Coventry until 14 January 2020, in a third round FA Cup game. Pask scored on his debut as Coventry won 3–0 against Bristol Rovers.

On 11 January 2022, Pask joined EFL League Two side Newport County on loan for the remainder of the 2021–22 season. He made his debut for Newport on 15 January 2022 in the starting line-up for the 4-0 League Two win against Harrogate Town.

Pask was released by the club at the end of the 2021–22 season.

Style of play
Pask has been described as "a centre-back by trade [who] can also play at right-back and as a holding midfielder".

Career statistics

References

External links

1997 births
Living people
Footballers from the London Borough of Waltham Forest
English footballers
Association football defenders
West Ham United F.C. players
Dagenham & Redbridge F.C. players
Gillingham F.C. players
Coventry City F.C. players
Newport County A.F.C. players
English Football League players
Black British sportspeople
The New Saints F.C. players